The 2010 League of Ireland First Division season was the 26th season of the League of Ireland First Division. The First Division was contested by 12 teams and Derry City won the title.

Teams

Overview
This season the division featured 12 clubs. The regular season began on 6 March and concluded on 30 October. Each team played the other teams three times, totaling 33 games. Derry City finished as champions and were automatically promoted to the Premier Division.

Final table

Results

Matches 1–22

Matches 23–33

Promotion/relegation play-offs

Premier Division
The second and third placed First Division teams, Waterford United and Monaghan United, played off to decide who would play the winner of the Premier Division play-off. The winner of this play off would play in the 2011 Premier Division.  
First Division 

First Division v Premier Division  

Bray Wanderers won 7 – 6 on penalties and retained their place in the Premier Division

First Division
The tenth placed First Division team, Salthill Devon, played the highest placed non-reserve team, Cobh Ramblers, from the 2010 A Championship. The winner of this play off would play in the 2011 First Division. 

Salthill Devon won 3 – 1 on aggregate and retained their place in the 2011 First Division

Top goalscorers
Includes goals scored in regular season only.

See also
 2010 League of Ireland Premier Division
 2010 League of Ireland Cup
 2010 A Championship
 List of 2009–10 League of Ireland transfers
 2010 Shamrock Rovers F.C. season
 2010 St Patrick's Athletic F.C. season

References

 
League of Ireland First Division seasons
2010 League of Ireland
2010 in Republic of Ireland association football leagues
Ireland
Ireland